is a Japanese dark fantasy manga series written and illustrated by Kazue Kato. The story revolves around Rin Okumura, a teenager who discovers he and his twin brother Yukio are the sons of Satan, born from a human woman, and he is the inheritor of Satan's powers. When Satan kills their guardian, Rin enrolls at True Cross Academy to become an exorcist under Yukio's tutelage in order to defeat his father Satan.

The manga has been serialized in Shueisha's Jump Square magazine since April 2009, with individual chapters collected in 28 tankōbon volumes as of November 2022. Viz Media has licensed the manga for North American production, with the first volume released in April 2011. Aniplex of America also released the anime's DVDs in English regions. The series was adapted into an anime television series produced by A-1 Pictures, and broadcast from April to October 2011. An anime film, Blue Exorcist: The Movie, premiered in December 2012. A second season, titled Blue Exorcist: Kyoto Saga, aired from January to March 2017. A third anime series adaptation has been announced.

As of December 2022, Blue Exorcist had over 25 million copies in circulation, making it one of the best-selling manga series. The manga has been well received by readers with sales having received a boost thanks to the anime's release.

Synopsis

Setting
The world of Blue Exorcist consists of two dimensions, attached to each other as a mirror and its reflection. Originally, a journey between the worlds, or even a contact between them, was impossible, however, any demon is able to pass to the dimension of Assiah through the possession of a living being in it. Even so, demons have historically wandered among humans unnoticed, visible only to people who have had contact with demons before.

In contrast, there are Exorcists, people who train to destroy demons who act in a damaging manner in Assiah. With more than two thousand years of existence, this group has several branches all over the world being secretly under the command of the Vatican itself and acting in a clandestine manner.

Plot

The story revolves around Rin Okumura, who, along with his younger twin Yukio Okumura, was raised by Father Shiro Fujimoto, an Exorcist. One day, Rin learns that he and Yukio are the sons of Satan. Witnessing Shiro dying to protect him, Rin draws the demon-slaying sword , which restrains his demonic powers. From that moment on, Rin not only gains demonic features like fangs and a tail, but also the power to ignite into blue flames that destroy almost anything he touches.

Rin wishes to become an Exorcist like his guardian to become stronger and to defeat Satan. Much to his surprise, Rin finds that Yukio is already a veteran Exorcist and is one of his teachers. Thus begins Rin's journey to become an Exorcist, accompanied by his brother and his fellow students who quickly become his close friends.

Production
Kazue Kato took inspiration from the 2005 film The Brothers Grimm, as she tried to work the angle of brothers fighting against monsters into a story. She eventually decided on making the story about demons and exorcists, thus conceiving Blue Exorcist. Due to exorcists being the main idea of the story, the manga features a lot of Biblical references. In an interview with Anime News Network, Kato said: "I should not run away from these references if I'm working in the Exorcist genre." An ending was planned by Kato but the exact length of the series has yet to be decided based on the manga's popularity in Japan.

In 2016, Kato stated, "I think there might be four more arcs. I have a rough storyline complete for the ending, but I haven’t figured out all of the details. I have a few things where I’m not sure what to decide to do." In July 2021, Kato announced that the manga would enter on an eight-month hiatus to work on a six-chapter manga mini-series adaptation of Fuyumi Ono's Eizen Karukaya Kaiitan. The manga resumed publication one month later than planned, on May 2, 2022.

Media

Manga

Blue Exorcist is written and illustrated by Kazue Kato. A one-shot chapter, titled , was first published in Shueisha's Jump Square on August 4, 2008. Blue Exorcist has been serialized in Jump Square since April 4, 2009. Shueisha has collected its chapters into individual tankōbon volumes. The first volume was released on August 4, 2009. As of November 4, 2022, twenty-eight volumes have been published.

The series has been licensed by Viz Media for release in North America, with the first volume released under the Shōnen Jump Advance imprint on April 5, 2011. Twenty-seven volumes have been released as of May 3, 2022. The series is also licensed in France by Kazé, and in Poland by Waneko.

A spin-off series written by Kato and illustrated by Minoru Sasaki, focused on Rin's brother, Yukio, titled , started in Jump SQ.19 on April 19, 2013. After the magazine ceased publication on February 19, 2015, the series was transferred to Jump Square. The series finished on April 3, 2020. Its chapters were collected in four tankōbon volumes, released from February 4, 2015, to June 4, 2020.

Anime

An anime adaption for the manga was announced on November 27, 2010, on Shueisha's Jump Square official website. The anime was produced by A-1 Pictures with Hitoshi Okamura as the producer. Originally, the series was scheduled to air on April 10, 2011, on MBS, replacing Star Driver: Kagayaki no Takuto; however, due to the March 11, 2011, Tōhoku earthquake and tsunami the series' broadcast was delayed until April 17, 2011. The anime ended on October 2, 2011.

The opening theme for the first 12 episodes is "Core Pride" by Japanese rock band Uverworld, while the opening theme from episode 13 onwards is "In My World" by Japanese rock band ROOKiEZ is PUNK'D. The ending theme for the first 12 episodes is "Take Off" by South Korean boy band 2PM, while the ending theme from episode 13 through episode 25 is "Wired Life" by Japanese singer Meisa Kuroki.

Aniplex announced they would simulcast the series in North America through video sites Hulu, Crunchyroll, Anime News Network and Netflix starting on April 20, 2011. Aniplex of America released Blue Exorcist on DVD in four sets, starting by releasing the first DVD on October 18, 2011. An OVA was released in 2011, called Ao No Exorcist: Kuro no Iede. The series began broadcasting in the United States and Canada on Viz Media's online network, Neon Alley, on October 2, 2012. The series began airing on Adult Swim's Toonami block on February 23, 2014, and finished airing on August 10, 2014.

After six years, a second season titled Blue Exorcist: Kyoto Saga was announced in June 2016 and premiered on January 7, 2017. Koichi Hatsumi directed the sequel, while Toshiya Ōno wrote the scripts, Keigo Sasaki designed the characters, and Hiroyuki Sawano and Kohta Yamamoto composed the series' soundtrack. A-1 Pictures returned to produce the animation. The series has been licensed by Aniplex of America.

In December 2022, it was announced that the series will receive another television series adaptation.

Film

An anime film, Blue Exorcist: The Movie, was released on December 28, 2012, in Japan. The English dub cast reprised their roles for the movie.

Other media
A stage play based on the series titled Live Act Ao no Exorcist: Mashin no Rakuin, ran for nine performances at the Nippon Seinenkan hall in Tokyo's Shinjuku ward from May 11–17, 2012. Satoshi Owada directed and wrote scripts for the play. Main characters Rin and Yukio Okumura were portrayed by Ryou Kimura and Kimito Totani respectively. A light novel titled Ao no Exorcist: Weekend Hero was written by Aya Yajima and illustrated by Kato. It was released by Shueisha on September 2, 2011. A visual novel for PlayStation Portable, Ao no Exorcist: Genkoku no Labyrinth was released on April 26, 2012, by Bandai Namco Games. A smartphone game, Blue Exorcist: Damned Chord was originally announced in December 2018, however in November 2020, it was announced that the game was canceled.

Reception

Manga
As of November 2016, Blue Exorcist had over 15 million copies in circulation. As of December 2022, the manga had over 25 million copies in circulation. The manga has been popular in Japan with the seventh volume receiving first print run of one million copies becoming the first Jump Square manga to reach such milestone. The release of the anime also drastically increased the manga's sales to the point that Shueisha decided to increase the print run for the seventh volume.

Critics have praised the Blue Exorcist manga, with Comic Book Bin reviewer Leroy Douresseaux feeling the first volume had potential, enjoying the comedy in the work and the characters and their interactions, recommending it to teen readers. Danica Davidson from Otaku USA felt that while the series employs disturbing storytelling, Rin's heroic traits despite being Satan's son make the plot more appealing to the readers. Kato's artwork has been praised by Anime News Networks Carlo Santos for the way each character has distinct traits while background images are well designed. Deb Aoki of About.com praised Kato's art and the series' "multi-dimensional world that melds European architecture, Japanese culture, modern technology and Tim Burton-esque whimsy", also stating that it is a "multicultural mishmash" of Harry Potter, Cirque du Soleil, Blade Runner and Alice in Wonderland, but she called the action scenes "a bit chaotic, and sometimes hard to follow".

Anime
Carl Kimlinger from Anime News Network emphasized how the execution was well-performed, resulting in entertaining episodes, especially its fight scenes, which were noted to be one of the anime's strongest points, and described it as "Great action, fun characters, and an occasional tug at the heart as well; every episode without fail is a blast". Sandra Scholes of active Anime noted similarities to other series like Trinity Blood, Fullmetal Alchemist and Bleach, but wrote that the story and characters have "plenty of their own to tantalize us to watch" and wrote that it is "a truly shōnen series, but there is room for some emotional scenes".

References

External links

  
  
 
 PSP Game official website 
 

2009 manga
2011 anime television series debuts
2017 anime television series debuts
A-1 Pictures
Adventure anime and manga
Anime OVAs composed by Hiroyuki Sawano
Anime composed by Hiroyuki Sawano
Anime series based on manga
Animeism
Aniplex franchises
Catholicism in fiction
Comics about spirit possession
Dark fantasy anime and manga
Demons in anime and manga
Exorcism in anime and manga
Fiction about the Devil
Mainichi Broadcasting System original programming
Musicals based on anime and manga
Shueisha franchises
Shueisha manga
Shōnen manga
Toonami
Viz Media manga
Works about the Illuminati